Kira Obolensky is an American playwright and author based in Minneapolis. She was awarded a Guggenheim Fellowship in 1997 in the field of drama and performance art. She won a Bush Foundation artist's fellowship in 1999.

Life 
Obolensky was born in New York to a Russian father and an Australian mother. She has two younger sisters. Obolensky was raised in Texas and New Orleans. She completed a degree at Williams College.

Obolensky adapted Holocaust survivor Sabina Zimering's memoir into a play in 2010.

Obolensky lives in South Minneapolis and is married to sculptor Irve Dell.

Selected works

References

External links 

 

Living people
Year of birth missing (living people)
Writers from New York (state)
American women dramatists and playwrights
20th-century American dramatists and playwrights
21st-century American dramatists and playwrights
American writers of Russian descent
American people of Australian descent
Writers from New Orleans
Writers from Texas
Writers from Minneapolis
Williams College alumni
20th-century American women
21st-century American women